The Western India Film Producers' Association (popularly known as WIFPA) is an organization for small film, regional film, and video album producers in North and West India.

External links

Organisations based in Mumbai
Film organisations in India
1960 establishments in Maharashtra
Organizations established in 1960